ASO Ormideia was a Cypriot football club based in Ormideia, Larnaca. It competed in the 1987–88 Cypriot Cup.

References

Defunct football clubs in Cyprus
1956 establishments in Cyprus